Ctenisolabis is a genus of earwigs in the subfamily Brachylabinae. It was cited by Srivastava in Part 2 of Fauna of India. It was also cited at an earlier date by Steinmann in his publication, The Animal Kingdom in 1986, 1989, 1990, and 1993.

List of species
 Ctenisolabis aciculata Steinmann, 1983
 Ctenisolabis fletcheri Burr, 1910
 Ctenisolabis loebli Steinmann, 1983
 Ctenisolabis mahunkai Steinmann, 1978
 Ctenisolabis montana (Borelli, 1909)
 Ctenisolabis nigra (Scudder, 1876)
 Ctenisolabis pusilla Steinmann, 1978
 Ctenisolabis ruficollis (Hincks, 1957)
 Ctenisolabis togoensis Verhoeff, 1902
 Ctenisolabis traegaordhi (Burr, 1913)

References

External links 
 The Earwig Research Centre's Ctenisolabis database Source for references: type Ctenisolabis in the "genus" field and click "search".
 genus Ctenisolabis Verhoeff, 1902 at Dermaptera Species File

Anisolabididae
Dermaptera genera